Puzzles of the Black Widowers is a collection of mystery short stories by American author Isaac Asimov, featuring his fictional club of mystery solvers, the Black Widowers. It was first published in hardcover by Doubleday in January 1990, and in paperback by Bantam Books the same year. The first British edition was issued in hardcover by Doubleday (UK) in April 1990, and the first British paperback edition by Bantam UK in April 1991.

This book is the fifth of six that describe mysteries solved by the Black Widowers, based on a literary dining club he belonged to known as the Trap Door Spiders.Asimov 1994, I. Asimov, chapter "120. The Trap Door Spiders". It collects twelve stories by Asimov, nine reprinted from mystery magazines and three previously unpublished, together with a general introduction and an afterword by the author following each story. Each story involves the club members' knowledge of trivia.

Contents
 Introduction
 "The Fourth Homonym" (1985)
 "Unique Is Where You Find It" (1985)
 "The Lucky Piece" (1990)
 "Triple Devil" (1985)
 "Sunset on the Water" (1986)
 "Where Is He?" (1986)
 "The Old Purse" (1987)
 "The Quiet Place" (1988)
 "The Four-Leaf Clover" (1990)
 "The Envelope" (1989)
 "The Alibi" (1989)
 "The Recipe" (1990)

Notes

External links
 
 

Mystery short story collections by Isaac Asimov
1990 short story collections
Doubleday (publisher) books